Pleiotaxis is a genus of African plants in the gerbera tribe within the daisy family.

 Species

References

Flora of Africa
Asteraceae genera
Mutisieae